Vildé-Guingalan (Gallo: Vildéu-Gengalan) is a commune in the Côtes-d'Armor department of Brittany in northwestern France.

Population

The inhabitants of Vildé-Guingalan are known in French as vildéens.

See also
 Communes of the Côtes-d'Armor department

References

Communes of Côtes-d'Armor